The 1971 Boston University Terriers football team was an American football team that represented Boston University as an independent during the 1971 NCAA College Division football season. In their third season under head coach Larry Naviaux, the Terriers compiled a 3–7 record and were outscored by a total of 284 to 200.

Schedule

References

Boston University
Boston University Terriers football seasons
Boston University Terriers football